Ligeophila is a genus of flowering plants from the orchid family, Orchidaceae. It is widespread across much of Latin America from southern Mexico to northern Argentina.

Ligeophila amazonica Garay - Venezuela 
Ligeophila bicornuta (Cogn.) Garay - Brazil
Ligeophila clavigera (Rchb.f.) Garay - from southern Mexico to central Brazil
Ligeophila gavilanensis Ormerod & G.A.Romero - Venezuela 
Ligeophila jamesonii Garay - Colombia, Ecuador
Ligeophila juruenensis (Hoehne) Garay - from Venezuela and Suriname south to Argentina
Ligeophila lutea Garay - Ecuador
Ligeophila macarenae Ormerod - Colombia
Ligeophila rosea (Lindl.) Garay  - from Colombia south to Argentina
Ligeophila stigmatoptera (Rchb.f.) Garay - Guyana, Suriname, Venezuela, Colombia, Peru, Brazil BZN 
Ligeophila umbraticola Garay - - Colombia, Brazil, Peru
Ligeophila unicornis Ormerod  - Venezuela

See also 
 List of Orchidaceae genera

References 

  (1977) Bradea, Boletim do Herbarium Bradeanum 2(28): 194–196, f. 1C, 2A.
  (2003). Genera Orchidacearum 3: 114 ff. Oxford University Press.
  2005. Handbuch der Orchideen-Namen. Dictionary of Orchid Names. Dizionario dei nomi delle orchidee. Ulmer, Stuttgart

External links 

Cranichideae genera
Goodyerinae